The 2017 season for the  cycling team began in January at the Tour Down Under. As a UCI WorldTeam, they are  obligated to send a squad to every event in the UCI World Tour.

Team roster

Riders who joined the team for the 2017 season

Riders who left the team during or after the 2016 season

Season victories

National, Continental and World champions

Footnotes

References

External links
 

2017 Cannondale-Drapac season
2017 in American sports
2017 road cycling season by team